Evenkiysky District, or Evenkia, is an administrative and municipal district (raion), one of the forty-three in Krasnoyarsky Krai, Russia. Before , it was split into three different districts - Baykitsky, Ilimpiyskiy and Tungussko-Chunsky - as the Evenk Autonomous Okrug—a federal subject (an autonomous okrug) of Russia. It is located in the central and eastern parts of the krai and borders with Taymyrsky Dolgano-Nenetsky District in the north, the Sakha Republic and Irkutsk Oblast in the east, Kezhemsky, Boguchansky, Motyginsky, and Severo-Yeniseysky Districts & Yeniseysky District in the south, and with Turukhansky District in the west. Its administrative center is the rural locality (a settlement) of Tura. Population:    The population of Tura accounts for 34.1% of the district's total population.

Geography 
River Arga-Sala, the largest tributary of the Olenyok, has its sources in the district. The southeastern coast of Lake Vivi is a geographical center of Russia.

History
The district was founded on December 4, 2006.

On 15 March 2019 there was a meteorite that made headlines, called the New Tunguska meteorite. A piece was recovered from the bottom of the Podkamennaya Tunguska River near the village of Uchami in the Krasnoyarsk region. The location is 420 kilometres from site of the large Tunguska Event of 1908.

Government
As of 2013, the Head of the district and the Chairman of the District Council is Pyotr I. Suvorov.

Demographics

Vital statistics
Source: Russian Federal State Statistics Service

Ethnic groups
Of the 17,697 residents (as of the 2002 Census), 2 (0.01%) chose not to specify their ethnic background. Of the rest, residents identified themselves as belonging to 67 ethnic groups, including ethnic Russians (62%), Evenks (21.5%), Yakuts (5.6%), Ukrainians (3.1%),  Kets (1.2%), 162 Tatars (0.9%), 152 Khakas (0.9%) and 127 Volga Germans (0.7%).

References

Notes

Sources

Districts of Krasnoyarsk Krai
States and territories established in 2006
Russian-speaking countries and territories